A list of films produced in Russia in 1994 (see 1994 in film).

1994

See also
 1994 in Russia

External links

1994
Russia
Films